Camp Orange was an Australian children's reality television show broadcast on Nickelodeon. The first season premiered in February 2005. The latest season, Camp Orange: Twisted Siblings, premiered on 27 June 2015.

The format has been adapted and produced for international markets, including Italy and, more recently, the UK. The latter, which was filmed and produced in Australia, premiered on 22 July 2011 in the UK and Ireland.

Overview
The show stars teams of best friends, selected from thousands of video audition entries that kids send in from across Australia and New Zealand, vying for the outdoor adventure of a lifetime. They battle it out in messy physical challenges that test their wits and their teamwork skills in order to win prizes. Starting from season 5, contestants would vote at the end of each day for 'Champ Orange', the best and fairest. From season 9, 'Champ Orange' is voted for by the public.

Season Overview

Seasons

Season 1 (2005)

Contestants

Season 2 (2006)

Season 3 (2007)

Season 4 (2008)

Season 5 (2009)
The season teams were:

Season 6 (2010)

Camp Orange: Castle Mountain

This is the first season to be hosted by Luke Ryan and Wyatt Nixon-Lloyd. There were four teams:

The winners of Champ Orange, the viewer voted champions, were Mighty Melbournians
a.k.a. Deon & Brody from Victoria. The winners of Camp Orange were Team: Wanna Beez
a.k.a. Niall & Brittany from New South Wales.

Season 7 (2011)
Season 7 was hosted by Luke and Wyatt. It was positioned as the grossest, slimiest and wrongest Camp Orange ever. This season, there were a few differences to previous seasons, including the first ever New Zealand team (The Awesome 2SUM), and a surprise fifth team (The Flip Sisters).

This season teams were:

The Flip Sisters arrived on the second day of Camp Orange as a surprise twist to the other contestants. The winners of Champ Orange were The Mighty Wood Ducks (Cooper and Jake).

Season 8 'Boys vs Girls' (2012)
Season 8 was hosted by Luke and Wyatt, and co-hosted by iCarly's Jennette McCurdy. This season pitted the girls' teams against boys' teams. Each team was led by a mentor, Wyatt (boys) and Jennette (girls). The season premiered on Tuesday, 26 June at 3:00 PM on Nickelodeon (Australia and New Zealand).

Teams featured in the season were:

The overall winners of the Camp Orange: Boys vs Girls were the girls' team (The Ballistic Belly-Buttons and The Grizzly Girls). The winners of Champ Orange were the Grizzly Girls (Monique and Giorgia).

Season 9 (2013)

Camp Orange: Spill Seekers

Season 9 was hosted by Luke & Wyatt. For the first time, the show was filmed at Seaworld Australia on the Gold Coast.

Teams featured in the season were:

Season 10 (2014)

Camp Orange: Force 10

The tenth season of Camp Orange was hosted by Luke and Wyatt with guest presenter Matt Bennett. Filming took place again at Seaworld Australia in March. It is set to air on Nickelodeon in June. This season there will be 10 contestants (5 teams) from the start. The season premiered in June 2014 and there were 6 episodes.

This season contestants are...

Season 11 (2015)

Camp Orange: Twisted Siblings
Nickelodeon's award-winning adventure series Camp Orange is back, taking a twisted turn on reality, turning up the gross-factor and seriously testing the threshold of sibling bonds for Camp Orange: Twisted Siblings! Bringing the thunder down under, teen super-stars Jack Griffo and
Kira Kosarin (who play twins, Max and Phoebe on Nickelodeon's hit live-action comedy, The Thundermans will host this year's show. 
A contrast to the glitz and glamour of the pair's home-town in Los Angeles, Jack and Kira will make their first trip to the Australian bush to lead four teams of sibling duos (who were chosen from hundreds of auditions sent in by kids across Australia and New Zealand) through the slimiest, smelliest and most seriously twisted challenges in the show's eleven seasons.
This year, campers have more at stake than ever before. The winning team, as voted by kids watching at home, will be crowned Nickelodeon's Star Siblings at a live series finale and score a recurring role on the channel as Nickelodeon's official kid reporters. By registering at Nickelodeon.com.au, kids at home will also have the chance to star in the series finale as the fifth Camp Orange team!
As well as mastering the physical challenges, siblings must also channel super-stomach strength to battle the Barf Buggy, a cart of disgusting delicacies that the winning team of each challenge must nominate a rival team to dine on.

Now in its eleventh season, Camp Orange is Nickelodeon Australia's multiple ASTRA Award-winning (2008, 2009, 2010) local production and Australia's longest running kids' reality series. Designed to give kids the ultimate adventure experience, Camp Orange celebrates kids being kids in the Aussie outdoors.

Camp Orange: Twisted Siblings premiered on Saturday, 27 June. It will air every Saturday until 1 August at 5:30pm as part of Nickelodeon's All New Saturdays.

The season's Campers are:

International

Camp Orange (UK Version)

References

Nickelodeon (Australia and New Zealand) original programming
Australian children's television series
2000s Australian reality television series
2005 Australian television series debuts
2010s Australian reality television series